Ann Cunningham Evans House is a historic home located at Caernarvon Township in Lancaster County, Pennsylvania. It was built about 1814, and is a -story, three-bay stone dwelling with a gable roof in the Federal style.  It has a two-story rear ell (c. 1814), sun porch (c. 1930), and  -story garage / kitchen addition (1950 / 1951).

It was listed on the National Register of Historic Places in 2002.

References 

Houses on the National Register of Historic Places in Pennsylvania
Federal architecture in Pennsylvania
Houses completed in 1814
Houses in Lancaster County, Pennsylvania
National Register of Historic Places in Lancaster County, Pennsylvania